César Gabriel Borda (19 April 1993 – 27 February 2019) was an Argentine professional footballer who played as a defender.

Career
Borda's career began with Lanús; signing in 2000. He made his senior bow for the Primera División team in 2012–13, appearing for the full duration of a Copa Argentina win over UAI Urquiza - a future club of his. In January 2015, Borda completed a move to Primera C Metropolitana's Talleres. One goal in thirty-four matches followed in his first campaign, which ended with promotion to Primera B Metropolitana - where he'd play fifty-four times across three years. On 20 June 2018, Borda was signed by UAI Urquiza. He featured in nineteen matches for them, before making his last appearance against ex-club Talleres on 19 February 2019.

Personal life
On 27 February 2019, Borda was found deceased at his home in Lanús by his father; having committed suicide by hanging, aged twenty-five. He had been experiencing issues with his wife, with whom he had a nine-month old daughter.

Career statistics

References

External links

1993 births
2019 deaths
Suicides by hanging in Argentina
Sportspeople from Lanús
Argentine footballers
Association football defenders
Primera C Metropolitana players
Primera B Metropolitana players
Club Atlético Lanús footballers
Talleres de Remedios de Escalada footballers
UAI Urquiza players
2019 suicides